Taste It: The Collection is a compilation of hits and album tracks released by Australian rock band INXS in 2006 spanning the albums X, Live Baby Live, Welcome to Wherever You Are, Full Moon, Dirty Hearts, The Greatest Hits and Elegantly Wasted.

Track listing
 "Bitter Tears"
 "Faith in Each Other"
 "Who Pays the Price"
 "Hear That Sound"
 "Shining Star"
 "Taste It"
 "All Around"
 "Wishing Well"
 "Strange Desire"
 "Please (You Got That...)" (featuring Ray Charles)
 "Kill the Pain"
 "I'm Only Looking"
 "Cut Your Roses Down"
 "The Strangest Party (These Are the Times)"
 "Don't Lose Your Head"
 "Shake the Tree"
 "Girl on Fire"
 "We Are Thrown Together"

Albums produced by Chris Thomas (record producer)
Albums produced by Bruce Fairbairn
Taste It : The Collection
Taste It: The Collection